Danny Phantom is an American animated superhero television series that aired on Nickelodeon from April 3, 2004 to August 24, 2007. The series follows 14-year-old Danny Fenton who, after an accident with an unpredictable portal between the human world and the supernatural "Ghost Zone,” becomes half-ghost and frequently saves his town and the material world from ghost/spectral attacks. Danny also faces the typical challenges of a high school student while attempting to keep his ghost half a secret, except from his best friends, Sam Manson and Tucker Foley, and later his sister, Jazz. As the show progresses, his ghostly abilities continue to develop and grow much stronger, and he gradually learns to control them.

Series overview

Episodes

Season 1 (2004–05)

Season 2 (2005–06)

Season 3 (2006–07)
All episodes this season were directed by Wincat Alcala, Gary Conrad and Butch Hartman, with the exception of Phantom Planet, which was directed solely by Hartman.

Short film

References

General

Specific

Danny Phantom
Danny Phantom
Danny Phantom